Gastão Elias was the three-time defending champion but chose not to defend his title.

Kaichi Uchida won the title after defeating Kimmer Coppejans 6–2, 6–4 in the final.

Seeds

Draw

Finals

Top half

Bottom half

References

External links
Main draw
Qualifying draw

Open de Oeiras III - 1